Auto GP, sometimes referred to as the Auto GP World Series and formerly known as both Euro Formula 3000 and the Euroseries 3000, was a European formula racing series.

The series' roots can be traced back to 1999 and the Italian Formula 3000 series, organised by Pierluigi Corbari, which used old Lola chassis with Zytek engines. The teams used the Lola T96/50 in the first two years. At the beginning nearly all races were held in Italy, but very quickly the series expanded and had venues in different European countries.

The series became European Formula 3000 in 2001. The next three years (2001–2003) saw the Lola B99/50 in use. For 2004, Superfund became the series' title sponsor, planning to use a new car with a new set of regulations, named Formula Superfund, but the funding was pulled before the 2005 season got under way and the series was cancelled.

For 2005, Coloni Motorsport established an Italian national-level championship, using the Italian Formula 3000 name. In 2006, Coloni expanded this to form a new European championship named Euroseries 3000 with the Lola B02/50. The Italian series continued to run as part of Euroseries races.

In 2009, the organisers announced that the first-generation A1 Grand Prix Lola B05/52 were allowed alongside the Lola F3000 chassis, replacing the old cars completely from 2010.

The championship itself was rebranded for the 2010 season, with it adopting the Auto GP name. As well as that, the championship offered a €200,000 prize fund at each of its six rounds.

2015 marked the start of the Auto GP World Series working with ISRA, a company from the Netherlands who set up the 2014 FA1 Series, this partnership, however, has not lasted long with the Auto GP Organisation announcing at Round 1 (of the 2015 season) that the two companies have parted ways. The 2015 season was "archived" midway through the season and midway through the 2016 season the series merged with the BOSS GP series.

Results

Formula 3000 era

Auto GP

Scoring system

Current system
Teams only score from their two highest placed cars. 48 points is the maximum possible haul for one driver in a race weekend.

Previous points systems

References

External links
 
 Official website for Euroseries 3000
 F3000 history at Unofficial F3000

 
Recurring sporting events established in 1999
Recurring sporting events disestablished in 2016